Take a Break! Pinball was a 1993 pinball computer game collection by Dynamix/Sierra On-Line. It contained several individual boards based on various Dynamix or Sierra series such as King's Quest, Space Quest,  The Adventures of Willy Beamish, Leisure Suit Larry, and Nova 9: The Return of Gir Draxon. It is the second game in the Take a Break! series of casual Windows games. It was designed for Windows 3.x.

Boards

Quest for Daventry
This board is based on King's Quest V. The game follows the narrative of the adventure game with objectives based on locations and encounters from that game. As objectives are completed on the board, new locations are opened up on the map. On this board, there was a bug that made the ball invisible after entering the Endless Desert Temple Stone Wall Trap. This was later patched with an updated DLL file.

Planet Pinball
Three boards based on Space Quest IV.

Level One: Planet Xenon in the Beginning

Level Two: Spaced Travel

Level Three: Reformation Day

Larry's Big Score
This board is based on Larry 5. It was later released as a stand-alone game in the early Leisure Suit Larry collections.

Flipped Out Willy
This board is based on The Adventures of Willy Beamish.

Draxon
Two boards based on Nova 9.

Level One: Nova 9

Level Two: Lots in Space

Reception
Computer Gaming World in 1993 liked Take a Break! Pinballs adventure game-like boards, but criticized the high CPU requirements, stating that performance "can be so bad as to be unplayable on a 386, and irritating on a 486". Interactive Entertainment CD ROM Magazine criticized the colorful graphics on the some boards, saying that they made it "nearly impossible to keep your eye on the ball". They said that "taken as a serious pinball simulation, it falls short in more than one area".

See also
King's Quest V: Absence Makes the Heart Go Yonder!
Space Quest IV: Roger Wilco and the Time Rippers
Leisure Suit Larry 5: Passionate Patti Does a Little Undercover Work
The Adventures of Willy Beamish
Nova 9: The Return of Gir Draxon

References

1993 video games
Pinball video games
Windows games
Windows-only games
Sierra Entertainment games
Dynamix games
Multiplayer and single-player video games
Video games developed in the United States